The Cayman Islands competed in the 15th Pan American Games which were held in Rio de Janeiro, Brazil, between 13 July 2007 and 29 July 2007.

Medals

Silver

Men's 200m Freestyle: Shaune Fraser

See also
 Cayman Islands at the 2006 Commonwealth Games
 Cayman Islands at the 2008 Summer Olympics

External links
Rio 2007 Official website

Nations at the 2007 Pan American Games
P
2007